Alloclita delozona is a moth in the family Cosmopterigidae. It is found in North Africa (Algeria, Tunisia and Morocco).

Adults have been recorded from the end of February to the beginning of April.

The larvae feed on Pulicaria.

References

Moths described in 1905
Antequerinae
Moths of Africa